James Marion Sims (January 25, 1813November 13, 1883) was an American physician in the field of surgery. His most famous work was the development of a surgical technique for the repair of vesicovaginal fistula, a severe complication of obstructed childbirth. He is also remembered for inventing Sims speculum, Sims sigmoid catheter, and the Sims position. Against significant opposition, he established, in New York, the first hospital specifically for women. He was forced out of the hospital he founded because he insisted on treating cancer patients; he played a small role in the creation of the nation's first cancer hospital, which opened after his death.

He was one of the most famous and venerated physicians in the country. In 1876, he was elected President of the American Medical Association. He was one of the first American physician to become famous in Europe. He openly boasted that he was the second-wealthiest doctor in the country.

However, as medical ethicist Barron H. Lerner states, "one would be hard pressed to find a more controversial figure in the history of medicine." A statue in his honor, the first statue in the United States in honor of a physician, was erected in 1894 in Bryant Park in New York City, but removed in 2018.

There are ethical questions raised by how he developed his surgical techniques. 
He operated without anesthesia on enslaved black women (who, like prisoners, could not meaningfully consent because they could not refuse) and immigrant Irish women. In the 20th century, this was condemned as an improper use of human experimental subjects and Sims was described as "a prime example of progress in the medical profession made at the expense of a vulnerable population". He has been called a "butcher" and compared to Nazi physician Josef Mengele. Sims' practices were defended as consistent with the US in the era in which he lived by physician and anthropologist L. Lewis Wall, and other medical historians. According to Sims, the enslaved black women were "willing" and had no better option.

Sims was a voluminous writer and his published reports on his medical experiments, together with his own 471-page autobiography (summarized in an address just after his death), are the main sources of knowledge about him and his career. His positive self-presentation has, in the late 20th and early 21st centuries, been subject to revision.

Childhood, education, and early career
James Marion Sims, who preferred to be called "Marion", was born in Lancaster County, South Carolina, the son of John and Mahala (Mackey) Sims. His father, Col. John Sims, "now [1856] of Texas," participated in the War of 1812, being stationed at Charleston. His paternal grandfather was one of Marion's men; his great-grandfather was with Washington at Braddock's defeat. His maternal grandfather, Charles Mackey, was taken prisoner by Banastre Tarleton, and would have been hanged, but for the intervention of his wife.

For his first 12 years, Sims' family lived in Lancaster Village, north of Hanging Rock Creek, where his father owned a store. Sims later wrote of his early school days there.

After his father was elected sheriff of Lancaster County, he sent Sims in 1825 to the newly established Franklin Academy, in Lancaster. In 1832, after two years of study at the predecessor of the University of South Carolina, South Carolina College, where he was a member of the Euphradian Society, Sims worked with Dr. Churchill Jones in Lancaster, South Carolina. He took a three-month course at the Medical College of Charleston (predecessor of the Medical University of South Carolina), but found it too rigorous.

He moved to Philadelphia, Pennsylvania, in 1834 and enrolled at the Jefferson Medical College, where he graduated in 1835, "a lackluster student who showed little ambition after receiving his medical degree". As he put it:
I felt no particular interest in my profession at the beginning of it apart from making a living.... I was really ready at any time and at any moment to take up anything that offered, or that held out any inducement of fortune, because I knew that I could never make a fortune out of the practice of medicine.

He returned to Lancaster to practice. As of that date "he had had no clinical experience, logged no actual hospital time, and had no experience diagnosing illnesses." After his first two patients (infants) died, Sims was despondent. He left and set up a practice in Mount Meigs, near Montgomery, Alabama. He described the settlement in a letter to his future wife Theresa Jones as "nothing but a pile of gin-houses, stables, blacksmith-shops, grog-shops, taverns and stores, thrown together in one promiscuous huddle". He was in Mount Meigs from 1835 to 1837. Sims visited Lancaster in 1836 to marry Theresa, whom he had met many years earlier, when a student in Lancaster. She was the daughter of B.C. Jones, and the niece of Churchill Jones, and had studied at the South Carolina Female Collegiate Institute.

In 1837 Sims and his wife moved to Cubahatchee, Alabama, where they remained until 1840. He was a "plantation physician", who had "a partnership in a large practice among rich plantations." "Sims became known for operations on clubfeet, cleft palates and crossed eyes." This was his first experience treating enslaved black women, whose owners summoned Sims to treat them. Being a "plantation physician" was not as lucrative as Sims hoped a life as a doctor would be.

Sims makes his reputation in Montgomery
In 1840 the couple moved to Montgomery, Alabama, where they lived until 1853. There Sims had what he described as the "most memorable time" of his career. Within a few years he "had the largest surgical practice in the State", the largest practice that any doctor in Montgomery had ever had, up to that time. "He was immensely popular, and greatly beloved." When he returned to the city for a visit in 1877, he was treated as a hero.

In Montgomery, Sims continued with what he had done as a plantation physician: treating the enslaved, who made up two thirds of the city's population. He built a hospital or "Surgical Infirmary for Negroes", for those women their owners brought him for treatment. It began with four beds, but it was so successful he added a second floor, doubling capacity to eight beds. Once source says it expanded to twelve beds. It has been called "the first woman's hospital in history". It was also the first hospital specifically for Blacks in the United States.

In 1840, the field of gynecology did not exist; there was no training on the subject, for Sims or anyone else. The only books were on midwifery. Medical students did not study pregnancy, childbirth, or gynecological diseases. Student doctors were often trained on dummies to deliver babies. They did not see their first clinical cases of women until beginning their practices. "The practice of examining the female organs was considered repugnant by doctors." Sims shared this view, remarking in his autobiography that "if there was anything I hated, it was investigating the organs of the female pelvis".

Attacks on and defenses of Sims
 Criticisms
 Sims' primary interest was not healing the woman he experimented on, but in building his reputation as a doctor.
 Sims conducted experiments on enslaved women, without their consent.
 He did not use anesthesia, because he did not think the enslaved women's suffering was important.
 One patient almost died from sepsis caused by a sponge left at the bladder entrance.
 Sims forced black women to assist him in his experiments, as white doctors would not.
 He experimented 30 times on one woman. (A defender praised this as indicative of Sims' "perseverence".)

Medical experimentation on enslaved women

Repair of vesicovaginal fistula

In 1845 he was brought a woman with a condition he had not seen before: vesicovaginal fistula. In the 19th century, vesicovaginal fistulas, "one of the most loathsome and disagreeable maladies to which females are subject," though not fatal, were a common, socially destructive, and "catastrophic complication of childbirth", that affected many women. There was no effective cure or treatment. Lacking adequate birth control, women generally had a high rate of childbirth, which increased their rate of complications. Vesicovaginal fistulas occur when the woman's bladder, cervix, and vagina become trapped between the fetal skull and the woman's pelvis, cutting off blood flow and leading to tissue death. The necrotic tissue later sloughs off, leaving a hole. Following this injury, as urine forms, it leaks out of the vaginal opening, leading to a form of incontinence. Because a continuous stream of urine leaks from the vagina, it is difficult to care for. The victim suffers personal hygiene issues that may lead to marginalization from society, and vaginal irritation, scarring, and loss of vaginal function. Sims also worked to repair rectovaginal fistulas, a related condition in which flatulence and feces escape through a torn vagina, leading to fecal incontinence.

When he went to see a patient with an injured pelvis from a fall from a horse, he placed her in a knee-chest position and inserted his finger into the vagina.  This allowed Sims to see the vagina clearly, and inspired him to investigate fistula treatment. Soon after, he developed a precursor to the modern speculum, using a pewter spoon and strategically placed mirrors. Sims was not the first to successfully treat a vesicovaginal fistula however. He was preceded by Dr. George Hayward in 1839 and John Peter Mettauer in 1838. Henry van Roonhuyse's clinical treatise entitled Medico-Chirurgical Observations (1676) outlined essential repair steps that are recognizable today.

From 1845 to 1849, Sims started doing experiments on enslaved black women to treat vaginal problems. He added a second story to his hospital, for a total of eight beds. He developed techniques that have been the basis of modern vaginal surgery. A key component was silver wire, which he had a jeweler prepare. The Sims' vaginal speculum aided in vaginal examination and surgery. The rectal examination position, in which the patient is on the left side with the right knee flexed against the abdomen and the left knee slightly flexed, is also named for him.

Experimental subjects
In Montgomery, between 1845 and 1849, Sims occasionally conducted experimental surgery on white women,  but his main subjects were 12 enslaved black women with fistulas, which he treated at his own expense in his backyard hospital. They were brought to him by their owners. Sims asked for patients with this fistula, and "succeeded in finding six or seven women". Sims took responsibility for their care on the condition that the owners provide clothing and pay any taxes; Sims provided food. One he purchased "expressly for the purpose of experimentation when her master resisted Sims' solicitations."

He named three enslaved black women in his autobiography: Anarcha, Betsy, and Lucy. Each suffered from fistula, and all were subjects of his surgical experimentation. From 1845 to 1849 he conducted experimental surgery on each of them several times, operating on Anarcha 30 times before the repair of her fistulas was declared a success. She had both vesicovaginal and rectovaginal fistulas, which he struggled to repair.  "Notwithstanding repeated failures during four years' time, he kept his six patients and operated until he tired out his doctor assistants, and finally had to rely upon his patients to assist him to operate." Unlike his previous essays, which included at least a brief description of his patients, the article issued in The American Journal of the Medical Sciences is devoid of any identifying characteristics of Anarcha, Betsy, and Lucy.

Sims' one-time collaborator, Nathan Bozeman, supplied the names of other African-American women treated by Sims during this period:
 Ann McRee, 16, treated by Sims for fistula in 1849.
 Lavinia Boudurant, 13, had a bladder calculus removed by Sims in 1850.
 Delia, 23, "Dr. Sims' own servant [slave]", between 1850 and 1853 underwent ten or more operations for fistula repair.
 Julia McDuffie, 20, operated on by Sims for fistula closure in March 1853, and again in June 1853, after his departure for New York, by his former colleague Nathan Bozeman.

Anesthesia
Although anesthesia had very recently been used experimentally, Sims did not use any anesthetic during his procedures on these three women. According to Sims, who later published a history of anesthesia, it was not generally known ("popularized") until 1846, and he was unaware of the use of diethyl ether. Experimental use of ether as an anesthetic was performed as early as 1842, however it was not published or demonstrated until 1846. A 2006 review of Sims' work in the Journal of Medical Ethics said that ether anesthesia was first publicly demonstrated in Boston in 1846, a year after Sims began his experimental surgery. The article notes that, while ether's use as an anesthetic spread rapidly, it was not universally accepted at the time of Sims' experimental surgery.

In addition, a common belief at the time was that black people did not feel as much pain as white people.

Given this, Sims did not anesthetize the women he operated on while developing his fistula repair technique. Anesthesia was itself still experimental; early anesthetic agents were much more dangerous than the replacements developed in the 20th century. Dosing was experimental. Underdosing did not kill the pain; overdosing could and sometimes did kill the patient. Chloroform could be obtained from a druggist, but nitrous oxide and the highly flammable ether had to be manufactured by the surgeon, on the spot. In Sims' day, surgeons were trained to operate quickly on unanesthetized patients. Anesthesia was first used in dentistry, and was just being announced as an exciting novelty in privately published pamphlets, some claiming credit for the anesthetic's first use, at the same time as Sims' fistula repair experiments.

Sims was well informed and subscribed to medical journals. He must have read one of the many reports about research into anesthesia; religious objections to anesthesia were brought up. As late as 1853, when Sims's fistula experiments were concluded and reports on them were being published, many "still doubted" chloroform's safety, and "the rules of its administration are [yet] to be formalized."

Sims later became an expert on anesthesia, publishing on nitrous oxide in 1868, and in 1874 on chloroform. In 1874 Sims addressed the New York State Medical Society on "The Discovery of Anaesthesia", in which he claimed American precedence over the British, and in 1880 read to the New York Academy of Medicine a paper, soon published, about a death from anesthesia.

One patient, named Lucy, nearly died from sepsis. He had operated on her without anesthetics in the presence of twelve doctors, following the experimental use of a sponge to wipe urine from the bladder during the procedure. She contracted sepsis because he left a sponge in her urethra and bladder. He did administer opium to the women after their surgery, which was accepted therapeutic practice of the day.

After the extensive experimental surgery, and complications, Sims finally perfected his technique. He repaired the fistulas successfully in Anarcha. He was the first to use silver as a suture, thus avoiding the infections associated with silk sutures. The silver-wire sutures, developed in 1849, were what allowed him to finally repair Anarcha's fistulas. Sims published an account of this in his surgical reports of 1852. He proceeded to repair fistulas in several other enslaved black women.

According to Durrenda Ojanuga, "Many white women came to Sims for treatment of vesicovaginal fistula after the successful operation on Anarcha. However, none of them, due to the pain, were able to endure a single operation." The Journal of Medical Ethics reports a case study of one white woman, whose fistula was repaired by Sims without the use of anesthesia, in a series of three operations carried out in 1849.

Sims later moved to New York to found a Woman's Hospital, where he performed the operation on white women. According to Ojanuga, Sims used anesthesia when conducting fistula repair on white women. But L. L. Wall, also writing for the Journal of Medical Ethics, states that as of 1857, Sims did not use anesthesia to perform fistula surgery on white women, citing a public lecture where Sims spoke to the New York Academy of Medicine on November 18, 1857. During this lecture, Sims said that he never used anesthesia for fistula surgery "because they are not painful enough to justify the trouble and risk attending their administration". While acknowledging this as shocking to modern sensibilities, Wall noted that Sims was expressing the contemporary sensibilities of the mid-1800s, particularly among surgeons who began their practice in the pre-anesthetic era.

Anarcha, Lucy, and Betsy, three of the enslaved black women experimented upon by Sims without consent, are memorialized in a statue entitled "Mothers of Gynecology", erected in Montgomery, Alabama, on September 24, 2021.

Trismus nascentium
During his early medical years, Sims also became interested in trismus nascentium, also known as neonatal tetanus, that occurs in newborns. A 19th century doctor described it as "a disease that has been almost constantly fatal, commonly in the course of a few days; the women are so persuaded of its inevitable fatality that they seldom or ever call for the assistance of our art."

Trismus nascentium is a form of generalised tetanus. Infants who have not acquired passive immunity from the mother having been immunised are at risk for this disease. It usually occurs through infection of the unhealed umbilical stump, particularly when the stump is cut with a non-sterile instrument. In the 21st century, neonatal tetanus mostly occurs in developing countries, particularly those with the least developed health infrastructure. It is rare in developed countries.

Trismus nascentium is now recognized to be the result of unsanitary practices and nutritional deficiencies. In the 19th century its cause was unknown, and many enslaved African children contracted this disease. Medical historians believe that the conditions of the quarters of enslaved people were the cause. Sims alluded to the idea that sanitation and living conditions played a role in its contraction.

He wrote:
Whenever there are poverty, and filth, and laziness, or where the intellectual capacity is cramped, the moral and social feelings blunted, there it will be oftener found. Wealth, a cultivated intellect, a refined mind, an affectionate heart, are comparatively exempt from the ravages of this unmercifully fatal malady. But expose this class to the same physical causes, and they become equal sufferers with the first.

Sims also thought trismus nascentium developed from skull bone movement during protracted births. To test this, Sims used a shoemaker's awl to pry the skull bones of enslaved infants into alignment. These experiments had a 100% fatality rate. Sims often performed autopsies on the corpses, which he kept for further research on the condition. He blamed these fatalities on "the sloth and ignorance of their mothers and the black midwives who attended them", as opposed to the extensive experimental surgeries that he conducted upon the babies.

Background
The use of enslaved people for medical research was uncontroversial in the Antebellum South. A prospectus from the 1830s of the South Carolina Medical College, the leading medical school in the South, pointed out to prospective students that it had an advantage of a peculiar character:

The college announced, in advertisements in the Charleston papers, that it had set up a surgery (operating room) for negroes, and offered to treat without charge, while it was in session, any "interesting cases" sent by their owners, "for the benefit and instruction of their pupils". They extended the offer to free "persons of color". The advertisement ends by pointing out that their sole objective was "to promote the interest of Medical Education. "

Criticism of Sims
Sims' experimental surgeries without anesthesia on enslaved women, who could not consent, have been described since the late 20th century as an example of racism in the medical profession. This is seen as part of the historical oppression of black people and vulnerable populations in the United States. Patients of Sims' fistula and trismus nascentium operations were not given available anesthetics. He caused the deaths of babies on whom he operated for the trismus nascentium condition.

In regards to Sims' discoveries, Durrenda Ojenunga wrote in 1993:

Terri Kapsalis writes, in Mastering the Female Pelvis, that "Sims' fame and wealth are as indebted to slavery and racism as they are to innovation, insight, and persistence, and he has left behind a frightening legacy of medical attitudes toward and treatments of women, particularly women of color."

Drawing on Sims' published autobiography, case-histories, and correspondence, historian Stephen C. Kenny highlights how Sims' surgical treatment of enslaved infants suffering from neonatal tetanus was a typical, but tragically distinctive, feature in the career of an ambitious medical professional in the slave south. Individual doctors like Sims and the profession were incentivized in multiple ways through the system of chattel slavery, many were not only enslaver-physicians, but also traded in enslaved people, while at the same time their medical research was advanced directly and significantly through the exploitation of the enslaved population. In a related article exploring the types, frequency and functions of slave hospitals in the American South, Kenny identifies Sims' private 'negro infirmary' located behind his office on South Perry as an example of a 'hospital-for-experimentation', where Sims also undertook a series of gruelling and dangerous invasive surgeries on enslaved men. Sims used the surgical opportunities presented by long neglected chronic – and often incurable – cases of illness and injuries among the enslaved to sharpen his skills and stake a claim for professional celebrity – all in the context of the profits to be made from human trafficking one of the South's busiest slave markets.

Author Harriet A. Washington, in her 2007 book Medical Apartheid, writes of Sims' experiments: "Each naked, unanesthetized slave woman had to be forcibly restrained by other physicians through her shrieks of agony as Sims determinedly sliced, then sutured her genitalia." Facing South, a publication of the Institute for Southern Studies, wrote that slaves were forced to hold each other down during surgery.

Defense of Sims
Physician L. L. Wall, writing in the Journal of Medical Ethics, says fistula surgery on non-anesthetized patients would require cooperation from the patient, and would not be possible if there were any active resistance from the patient. Wall writes that surviving documentation from the time says the women were trained to assist in their own surgical procedures. Wall also argues the documentation suggests the women consented to the surgeries, as the women were motivated to have their fistulas repaired, due to the serious medical and social nature of vesicovaginal and rectovaginal fistulas. 
According to gynaecologist Caroline M. de Costa, writing in the Medical Journal of Australia:

In his autobiography, J. Marion Sims said he was indebted to the enslaved black women on whom he experimented. Shortly after Sims' successful repair of Anarcha's vesicovaginal and rectovaginal fistulas in 1849, he successfully repaired the fistulas of the other enslaved women. They returned to their owners' plantations.

Sims has been criticized for operating on the enslaved black women without their consent. Wall writes in the Journal of Medical Ethics that legally, consent was granted by the slaves' owners. He noted that enslaved black women were a "vulnerable population" with respect to medical experimentation. Wall also writes that Sims obtained consent from the women themselves.

He cites an 1855 passage from New York Medical Gazette and Journal of Health, where Sims wrote:

For this purpose [therapeutic surgical experimentation] I was fortunate in having three young healthy colored girls given to me by their owners in Alabama, I agreeing to perform no operation without the full consent of the patients, and never to perform any that would, in my judgment, jeopard life, or produce greater mischief on the injured organs—the owners agreeing to let me keep them (at my own expense) till I was thoroughly convinced whether the affection could be cured or not.

Deirdre Cooper Owens wrote: "Sims has been painted as either a monstrous butcher or a benign figure who, despite his slaveowning status, wanted to cure all women from their distinctly gendered suffering." She describes these opposing views as overly reductionist, saying his history is more nuanced. He lived in a slave-holding society and expressed the racism and sexism that were considered normal during his time.

New York: the first woman's hospital

Sims moved to New York in 1853, reluctantly, because of his health. He decided to focus on diseases of women. He had an office at 267 Madison Avenue. In 1860 a newspaper described his success as "splendid," and called him "the happiest man in New York."

In 1855 he founded the Woman's Hospital, which, not counting his backyard infirmary, was the first hospital for women in the United States. At its inception, Woman's Hospital's purpose was to repair vesico-vaginal fistulas using Sims' technique, in service to the poor. There were no "pay patients" admitted. Located on Madison Avenue and 29th Street in a rented, four-story house, location deliberately chosen to be near Sims' home, the hospital's 30 beds were quickly filled. In those early days, Sims operated without assistance from other doctors, performing one fistula repair each day.

His project met with "universal opposition" from the New York medical community; it was due to prominent women that he established it. They were visited by "prominent doctors, who endeavored to convince them that they were making a mistake, that they had been deceived, that no such hospital was needed, etc." "I was called a quack and a humbug, and the hospital was pronounced a fraud. Still it went on with its work." In the Woman's Hospital, he performed operations on indigent women, often in an operating theatre so that medical students and other doctors could view it, as was considered fundamental to medical education at the time. Some patients remained in the hospital indefinitely and underwent repeated procedures.

When Sims addressed the American Medical Association in 1858 on the topic "Treatment of the results of obstructed labor", the "charts" which illustrated it "caused the lady auditors to vacate the gallery."

Sims and the Confederacy

Sims' Southern sympathies were no secret—he was no abolitionist—and even in New York, many of his patients were Southern ladies. As the American Civil War drew near, this practice fell away, and he did not feel comfortable remaining in New York.

In 1861 Sims, who considered himself "a loyal Southerner", moved to Europe, where he toured hospitals and worked on fistula patients in London, Paris, Edinburgh, Dublin, and Brussels. He simultaneously ran consulting rooms in Paris, Berlin, and London.

However, according to J.C. Hallman, he was there as one of several government agents of the Confederacy, who were seeking money (loans), diplomatic recognition of their new government (no country ever recognized it), and supplies and ships. An intercepted letter informed Lincoln's Secretary of State, William H. Seward, that Sims was "secessionist in sentiment", and that his "purpose in going abroad at this time is believed to be hostile to the government", as Seward reported to U.S. diplomats in Europe. According to the U.S. Minister in Brussels Henry Shelton Sanford, Sims was a "violent secessionist", and his "movements in Europe had 'given color to (the) opinion' that he was a spy".

The most celebrated episode in Sims' life was his summons, in 1863, to treat Empress Eugénie for a fistula. This widely reported episode helped Sims to solidify his worldwide reputation as a surgeon. But according to Hallman, no source confirms that Eugénie had any medical problem at all. Sims' visits to the palace were semi-diplomatic Confederate visits, and the illness an invention to escape the vigilance of the U.S. diplomats, who had their eyes on Sims. Eugénie became an "ardent disciple" of the Confederacy.

Sims remained in Europe until almost the end of Civil War, in 1865.

Sims later said that it was a "dreadful mistake ... to give the negro the franchise." Two years later, offering a toast on board the steamer Atlantic, returning to Europe, he claimed that in the aftermath of the war, the South had been degraded "beyond the level of the meanest slave that ever wore a shackle."

At the same time, Sims argued that it was puerile for the South to sulk in its loss. He called for an acceptance of the issues of the war, including the Fifteenth Amendment. "It is folly to talk of the lost cause," he said.

Later career
Having treated royalty, after his return to the United States, Sims raised his charges in his private practice. He effectively limited it to wealthy women, although "he always had a long roll of charity patients". He became known for the Battey surgery, which contributed to his "honorable reputation". This involved the removal of both ovaries. It became a popular treatment to relieve insanity, epilepsy, hysteria (diseased uterus), and other "disorders of the nerves" (as mental illness was called at the time). At the time, these were believed to be caused by disorders of the female reproductive system.

Sims received honors and medals for his successful operations in many countries. Since the 20th century, the necessity of many of these surgeries has been questioned. He performed surgery for what were considered gynecological issues: such as clitoridectomies, then believed to control hysteria or improper behavior related to sexuality. These were done at the requests of the women's husbands or fathers, who were permitted under the law to commit the women to surgery involuntarily.

Under the patronage of Napoleon III, Sims organized the American-Anglo Ambulance Corps, which treated wounded soldiers from both sides at the Battle of Sedan.

The first cancer hospital
In 1871, Sims returned to New York and resumed working at the Woman's Hospital, during which he provided surgical treatment for women with cancer. At the time, cancer was a disreputable disease, feared by some to be contagious or even sexually transmitted. In response to Sims' efforts, the highly influential Ladies' Board of the Woman's Hospital strongly argued against the treatment of cancer patients, which resulted in the hospital prohibiting the admission of cancer patients. At a meeting of the hospital's Board of Governors in 1874, Sims gave a speech rebuking the Board for denying the treatment of cancer even in its earliest stages. In addition, he criticized the restriction imposed by the Ladies' Board limiting the number of spectators to fifteen on operating days. Previously, as many as sixty could observe any given operation, but this had been changed because the Ladies' Board considered it an affront to a woman's modesty to have more than fifteen male surgeons observe a woman's sexual organs under treatment. Sims argued that this restriction impaired the distribution of knowledge to the many surgeons who came to New York to study gynecological diseases.

The controversial nature of Sims' speech within the Woman's Hospital resulted in the acceptance of his resignation by the Board of Governors a month later, as well as accusations of being "reckless" and "lethal" by a member of the Board of Governors, who argued Sims should be fired for his insubordination, and a conflict with some other doctors of the Woman's Hospital, with whom Sims carried on a dialogue by means of published pamphlets.

After quarreling with the board of the Woman's Hospital over the admission of cancer patients, Sims became instrumental in establishing America's first cancer institute, New York Cancer Hospital.

In reply to the treatment he received from the Woman's Hospital, Sims was unanimously elected president of the American Medical Association, an office he held from 1876 to 1877.

Death
Sims suffered two angina attacks in 1877, and in 1880, contracted a severe case of typhoid fever. W. Gill Wylie, an early 20th-century biographer, said that although Sims suffered delirium, he was "constantly contriving instruments and conducting operations". After several months and a move to Charleston to aid his convalescence, Sims recovered in June 1881. He traveled to France. After his return to the United States in September 1881, he began to complain of an increase in heart problems.

In 1881, Sims was one of four physicians asked for an opinion about whether medical errors had contributed to the recent death of President Garfield.

According to Wylie, Sims consulted with doctors for his unknown cardiac condition both in the United States and in Europe. He was "positive that he had a serious disease of the heart and it caused deep mental depression". He was halfway through writing his autobiography and planning a return visit to Europe when he died of a heart attack on November 13, 1883, in New York City (Manhattan). He had just visited a patient with his son, H. Marion Sims. He is buried at Green-Wood Cemetery in Brooklyn, New York.

Legacy and honors

 On the title page of the reprint of an article, "History of the Discovery of Anesthesia", first published in the May 1877 number of the Virginia Medical Monthly, Sims listed his honors as: Author of "Silver Sutures in Surgery," "The Sims Operation for Vesico-Vaginal Fistula," "Uterine Diseases," "History of the Discovery of Anaesthesia", Etc., Etc.; Member of the Historical Society of New York; Surgeon to the Empress Eugenie; Delegate to Annual Conference of the Association for the Reform and Codification of the Law of Nations, 1879; Founder of the Woman's Hospital of the State of New York, and formerly Surgeon to the Same; Centennial President of the American Medical Association, Philadelphia, 1876; President of the International Medical Congress at Berne, 1877; Fellow of the American Medical Association; Permanent Member of the New York State Medical Society; Fellow of the Academy of Sciences, of the Academy of Medicine, of the Pathological Society, of the Neurological Society, of the County Medical Society, and of the Obstetrical Society of New York; Fellow of the American Gynaecological Association; Honorary Fellow of the State Medical Societies of Connecticut, Virginia, South Carolina, Alabama and Texas; Honorary Fellow of the Royal Academy of Medicine of Brussels; Honorary Fellow of the Obstetrical Societies of London, Dublin and Berlin, and of the Medical Society of Christiana [Oslo]; Knight of the Legion of Honor (France); Commander of Orders of Belgium, Germany, Austria, Russia, Spain, Portugal and Italy, Etc., Etc., Etc.
 A bronze statue by Ferdinand Freiherr von Miller (the younger), depicting Sims in surgical wear, was erected in Bryant Park, New York, in 1894, taken down in the 1920s amid subway construction, and moved to the northeastern corner of Central Park, at 103rd Street, in 1934, opposite the New York Academy of Medicine. The address delivered at its rededication was published in the Bulletin of the New York Academy of Medicine. This is the first statue erected in the United States in honor of any physician. The statue became the center of protests in 2017 due to Sims' operations on enslaved black women. The statue was defaced with the word RACIST and had the eyes painted red. In April 2018, the New York City Public Design Commission voted unanimously to have the statue removed from Central Park and installed in Green-Wood Cemetery, near where Sims is buried. (As of 2022, it has not yet been installed there.) Nature magazine published an editorial criticizing the removal, then retracted it after reader protests.
In November 2017, author J.C. Hallman's article about Sims' Central Park statue, "Monumental Error" appeared on the cover of Harper's Magazine. The article played a role in the broader discussion about Confederate monuments, and in a later op-ed for the Montgomery Advertiser, Hallman revealed Sims' career as a spy during the Civil War and the fraudulent history of another Sims monument in Montgomery, Alabama.
 Another memorial was installed on the grounds of his alma mater, Jefferson Medical College.
 There is a statue on the grounds of the Alabama State Capitol in Montgomery (dedicated in 1939). In April 2018, when Silent Sam was doused with red ink and blood, the statue had ketchup thrown on it while a skit about Sims was performed. "An alternative statue of Sims's 'first cure', the young woman known as Anarcha, was erected in protest only to be stolen in the night." This statue of Sims was originally intended to be one of Alabama's two statues in the National Statuary Hall Collection at the U.S. capitol.
 Another statue of Sims, installed in 1929, is at the South Carolina State House in Columbia; the mayor of Columbia, Stephen K. Benjamin, in 2017 called for its removal, as have other protestors.
 A painting by Marshall Bouldin III entitled Medical Giants of Alabama, that depicted Sims and other white men standing over a partially clothed black patient, was commissioned for $20,000 in 1982 (paid for by donors). It was on display at the University of Alabama at Birmingham's Center for Advanced Medical Studies, but was removed in late 2005 or early 2006 because of complaints from people offended by it, and the ethical questions associated with Sims.
 The Medical University of South Carolina, whose predecessor Sims attended, set up around 1980 an endowed chair in his honor. In February, 2018, the chair was renamed. However, a "J. Marion Sims Chair" in obstetrics and gynecology still appears in a March 2018 program. A J. Marion Sims Society, a student organization, existed there from 1923 to 1945.
 A Sims Memorial Address on Gynecology, delivered before the South Carolina Medical Society at Charleston, is documented from 1927.
 In 1950, a historical marker was erected near the site of his parents' farmhouse, where he was born. Present at the dedication ceremony were Congressman James P. Richards and representatives of the American Medical Association, the Medical College of South Carolina, the University of South Carolina, the chairman of Lancaster's Marion Sims Memorial Hospital board, the state archivist of South Carolina, and four of Sims' children. Dr. Roderick McDonald, president of the South Carolina Medical Association, introduced the speaker, Dr. Seale Harris, past president of the Southern Medical Association and former editor of the Southern Medical Journal, whose biography of Sims, Woman's Surgeon: the Life Story of J. Marion Sims, had just been published.
 The medical college at the University of South Carolina is named Sims College in his honor; in June 2020, the university passed a resolution asking for the state to rename the college pursuant to the South Carolina Heritage Act.
 A cartoon of Sims appeared on the cover of the November 2017 issue of The Nation.
 A J. Marion Sims Foundation was founded in 1995 in his home town of Lancaster, South Carolina. It has dispensed almost $50,000,000 in grants.
 The Marion Sims Memorial Hospital is located in Lancaster.
 In Montgomery, Alabama, a historical marker at 37 South Perry St. marks the location of Sims' house and backyard hospital or infirmary. The building on the site is from the early 20th century.
 In 1953, Sims was elected to the Alabama Hall of Fame.
 On April 3, 2018, Behind the  Sheet, written by Charly Evon Simpson, was presented in New York at the Ensemble Studio Theatre: "Philomena is a slave woman forced to assist her owner as he searches for a cure for fistulas. Everything changes when she becomes his patient."

Contributions
 Vaginal surgery: fistula repair. Invented silver wire as a suture.
 Instrumentation: Sims' speculum; Sims' sigmoid catheter. There is a petition campaign to have Sims' name removed from the devices he invented: "Sims uterine curette, uterine sound, vaginal retractor, uterine scissors, and rectal speculum." New names would be chosen by "a committee of POC (People of Color)."
 Exam and surgical positioning: Sims' position.
 Fertility treatment: Insemination and postcoital test.
 Cancer care: Sims argued for the admission of cancer patients to the Woman's Hospital, despite contemporary beliefs that the disease was contagious.
 Abdominal surgery: Sims advocated a laparotomy to stop bleeding from bullet wounds to this area, repair the damage and drain the wound. His opinion was sought when President James Garfield was shot in an assassination attempt; Sims responded from Paris by telegram. Sims' recommendations later gained acceptance.
 Gallbladder surgery: In 1878, Sims drained a distended gallbladder and removed its stones. He published the case believing it was the first of its kind; however, a similar case had already been reported in Indianapolis in 1867.

See also
 Unethical human experimentation in the United States
 List of monument and memorial controversies in the United States#J. Marion Sims (2017)
 Anarcha Westcott
 Mothers of Gynecology Movement

Archival material
Papers of Dr. Sims—about 150 items— are held by the Wilson Library, University of North Carolina at Chapel Hill. The collection has been microfilmed and some is available online. A small number of letters are in the libraries of the Medical University of South Carolinaf and Duke University.

References

Examinations of the ethical questions regarding Sims
 Critical of Sims
 
  
 
 
  Comments on the article of O'Leary just cited.
 
 
 
 
 
  L. L. Wall responded in the same journal in 2021; cited below.
 

 Defenses of Sims
 
 
 
 

 
 
 
 
 
 
 
 
 
 
 Unclassified

Further reading (arranged by date)

 
  [The link is to a reprint. The title at the beginning of the text is "The clamp suture and the range of its applicability, considered in relation to the cure of the injuries incident to parturition, with statistics."]

Video

External links

 "J. Marion Sims", Encyclopedia of Alabama
 

1813 births
1883 deaths
19th-century American physicians
Activists from Montgomery, Alabama
American gynecologists
American medical researchers
American proslavery activists
American slave owners
American surgeons
Burials at Green-Wood Cemetery
Clinical research ethics
History of medicine in the United States
History of Montgomery, Alabama
Human subject research in the United States
Infanticide
Medical scandals in the United States
People from Lancaster County, South Carolina
People of Alabama in the American Civil War
Physicians from Alabama
Physicians from New York (state)
Physicians from South Carolina
Presidents of the American Medical Association
Thomas Jefferson University alumni
University of South Carolina alumni